Infinite F (stylized as INFINITE F) is the second sub-group of South Korean boy band Infinite formed by Woollim Entertainment in 2014. The sub-group consists of Infinite vocalists: Sungyeol, L and Sungjong. The sub-group made their simultaneous Japanese and Korean debuts with the single albums Koi no Sign and Azure.

History

2011–2014: Formation and debut 
Infinite F first performed as an unofficial unit at Infinite's 1st Inspirit Inauguration on August 17. The trio did a cover of Orange Caramel's "Bangkok City" which was well received by fans.

Infinite F was officially announced at the One Great Step Returns encore concert, held February 28 and March 1. They also performed the song "Heartthrob" for the first time. The song was eventually revealed to be the main OST for the KBS drama Hi! School-Love On, starring group member Sungyeol and Infinite fellow member Woohyun. 

The unit would have their first official release on Infinite's second Korean studio album, Season 2. The song "Going Crazy" was composed by Konan of indie Korean rock group Rocoberry.

On October 14, Woollim Entertainment officially announced that Infinite F will be debuting in Japan with Koi no Sign on November 19. Akiko Higashimura, creator of Princess Jellyfish, provided illustrations for the album jacket. Koi no Sign debuted on the Oricon Weekly Chart at #6, selling 31,287 copies. The album was later released in Korean version titled Love Sign.

As part of Japanese promotions, a pop-up store was set up in Harajuku from November 17 to 30, selling various Infinite F goods and clothing items. In addition, the sub-group did a five-show showcase tour, performing in Osaka, Nagoya and Tokyo.

On November 5, the album cover for Azure was revealed, closely followed by the announcement that Infinite F would be debuting in Korea the following week. Azure and its music video for "Heartthrob" was released on December 2. The sub-group made their official music show debut on Music Bank on December 5. On December 12, Infinite F became the first Infinite sub-group or solo to be nominated for first place on a music show.

Discography

Single albums

Singles

Other charted songs

Awards and nominations

References

Universal Music Japan artists
Musical groups established in 2014
South Korean dance music groups
Japanese-language singers of South Korea
Woollim Entertainment artists
K-pop music groups
South Korean boy bands
Musical groups from Seoul
Infinite (group)
2014 establishments in South Korea